Alberto Rapisarda was born in Conegliano (Treviso), Italy in 1964. He is an Italian comics and multimedia artist who started writing and drawing comics in the mid-1980s for the Rome based Frigidaire Magazine. Since 1983, he has also collaborated with Zio Feininger, a comics school and cultural association which was founded in Bologna by Andrea Pazienza, Lorenzo Mattotti and others, and has the goal of promoting Italian cartoonists through exposition and live performance.

External links 
 Official site

1964 births
Living people
Italian comics artists
Date of birth missing (living people)